This is a list of top 100 cities ranked by the number of international visitors, including all international arrivals by land, air, and sea, for tourist or business purposes. The consulting firm Euromonitor and the financial services corporation Mastercard define the concept of the foreign visitor differently thus their respective rankings differ.

Euromonitor counts a visitor as any person visiting a city in another country for at least 24 hours, for a period not exceeding 12 months, and staying in paid or unpaid, collective or private accommodation. Each arrival is counted separately and includes people travelling more than once a year and people visiting several cities during one trip. The growth column compares international arrivals to the previous year. 

Mastercard Global Destinations Cities Index counts a visitor only if a person stayed overnight at least once in the city. The income column shows the amount visitors spent in each city. For cities bordering directly on foreign territory, border crossings from country to country are not counted as international visitors.

See also
 World Tourism rankings

References 

Tourism-related lists
International visitors